Lamontichthys filamentosus is a species of armored catfish found in the Amazon basin of Bolivia, Brazil and Peru.  This species grows to a length of  SL. They are found primarily on the northern ridge of the Marañón River as well as in the Inambari River.

References 

Harttiini
Fish of South America
Fish of Bolivia
Fish of Brazil
Fish of Peru
Taxa named by Francesca LaMonte
Fish described in 1935